The 1958 Ball State Cardinals football team was an American football team that represented Ball State Teachers College (later renamed Ball State University) in the Indiana Collegiate Conference (ICC) during the 1958 NCAA College Division football season. In their third season under head coach Jim Freeman, the Cardinals compiled a 6–2 record (4–2 against ICC opponents).

Schedule

References

Ball State
Ball State Cardinals football seasons
Ball State Cardinals football